Dianne Saxe is a Canadian lawyer and politician who was elected to represent Ward 11 University—Rosedale on Toronto City Council following the 2022 municipal election. Before entering politics, Saxe practised environmental law and served as the last environmental commissioner of Ontario from 2015 to 2019. She was deputy leader of the Green Party of Ontario (GPO) from 2020 to 2022.

Legal career

Education 
Saxe studied law at Osgoode Hall Law School, earning an Bachelor of Laws (L.L.B.) in 1974. She was called to the bar in 1976 and earned a Ph.D. in law from Osgoode in 1991.

Career 
Prior to entering the government sector, Saxe worked in private practice with two major law firms and then ran an environmental law boutique firm for 25 years. Her early career focused on the intersection of environmental law and corporate liability, while her more recent practice has centred on climate change and related law. She has published widely on environmental issues. From 1975 to 1989, Saxe practiced law with the Government of Ontario.

In 1991, Saxe moved into private practice. She represented the Association of Municipalities of Ontario (AMO) in their successful $115 million claim against Stewardship Ontario for the cost of Ontario's Blue Box program in 2014.

Environmental Commissioner of Ontario 
Saxe was unanimously named the environmental commissioner of Ontario in 2015 by the Legislative Assembly of Ontario for a five year term. The commissioner was an independent officer of the legislature which monitored the Environmental Bill of Rights, and submitted annual reports on the province's progress on each of energy conservation, environmental protection and climate change. She was also permitted to deliver special reports. As commissioner, she delivered 17 reports to the legislature on topics including environmental injustice to First Nations, electricity, waste and circular economy, endangered species, water pollution, soil health and climate policy.

On November 15, 2018, the Progressive Conservative (PC) government announced their intention to abolish the position of environment commissioner, transferring some of its functions to the auditor general. Saxe had published reports critical of the incoming administration's environmental positions, including the absence of a climate change policy. The decision to eliminate independent environmental oversight was widely reported on. More than 200 scientists and researchers sent an open letter to Premier Doug Ford calling for reconsideration. Her last report was heavily critical of the Ford government. After 25 years, the position of the environmental commissioner of Ontario ceased to exist when the Environmental Bill of Rights was amended on April 1, 2019.

Return to private practice 
After being the Environmental Commissioner of Ontario, Saxe reopened her SaxeFacts environmental law practice focussed on climate issues. She publishes articles and a blog and presents on climate issues. She was a McMurtry Clinical Fellow at Osgoode Hall Law School from 2019 to 2020, is a senior fellow at Massey College, and an adjunct professor at the University of Toronto School of the Environment. She hosts a podcast called "Green Economy Heroes" features interviews with green business leaders, and has also been a public support to the youth climate strikes movement in Toronto.

Political career

2022 provincial election 
Saxe ran for the Green Party of Ontario in University—Rosedale. Her candidacy was confirmed along with the deputy leader role on November 30, 2020. She has cited the climate crisis as a primary reason for her political run as well as the well-publicized conflict with Ford over the closure of her office. The riding was one of a small number of ridings the Ontario Greens targeted to add to the single-seat caucus of provincial leader Mike Schreiner in the 2022 election; Saxe featured prominently in party campaign messaging and her riding was chosen for the platform launch. Housing policy and sprawl—key policy battles in Greater Toronto—were a focus of Saxe's campaign to curb Ontario emissions. The official party platform listed mental health, affordable housing, and the climate economy as its primary election pillars. Saxe came in fourth place, with 6,092 total votes for a share of 15.9 per cent; the riding was won by the incumbent, New Democratic Party (NDP) member of Provincial Parliament (MPP) Jessica Bell. Saxe nearly tripled the Green vote share achieved in the 2018 provincial election.

2022 municipal election 
Ward 11 University—Rosedale was left vacant for the 2022 election when Councillor Mike Layton announced he would not seek re-election. Saxe announced her candidacy for the 2022 Toronto municipal election, concluding on October 24, 2022. Saxe stated that she was running as an independent municipally and would resign as deputy leader of the GPO if elected.

Saxe list housing, mobility, climate and sustainability, and a city in good repair as her primary platform planks.

She won with 8,614 votes and 35.37 per cent of the total, a little more than 100 votes more than runner-up Norm Di Pasquale, a Catholic school trustee. She officially took office on November 15, 2022.

Awards and recognition 
Saxe is a recipient of numerous awards, including specialist certifications from The Law Society of Upper Canada, Osgoode Hall Law School Alumni Gold Key for Achievement  and a 2020 Law Society Medal for exemplary leadership in environmental law. In August 2020, Saxe completed her training to become an En-ROADS Climate Ambassador, a member in the international network that leads climate simulation events developed by Climate Interactiv] and the MIT Sloan Sustainability Initiative. Saxe is also a trained Climate Reality Leader, having been personally trained by Al Gore on the climate crisis and its solutions.

Saxe sat on a number of public and private boards, including Draxis Health, Solarshare, WindShare and Evergreen, helped to manage the endowment of the Ontario Bar Association and is recognized as board-ready by Women in Capital Markets. In June 2022, she was awarded an honourary doctorate of Environmental Studies from the University of Waterloo.

Personal life 
Saxe is the daughter of Morton Shulman, a physician who served as a NDP MPP in the 1960s and 1970s. She is the mother of MIT neuroscience professor Rebecca Saxe, and University of Toronto civil engineering professor, Shoshanna Saxe.

Publications

Books 
 Environmental Offences Corporate Responsibility and Executive Liability (1990), Canada Law Book.
 A Buyer's Guide to Contaminated Land (1994), Edmond Montgomery.<ref>{{cite web |title=Book Review - A Buyer's Guide to Contaminated Land, 1996 CanLIIDocs 14 |url=https://www.canlii.org/en/commentary/doc/1996CanLIIDocs14?zoupio-debug=#!fragment/zoupio-_Toc3Page1/(hash:(chunk:(anchorText:zoupio-_Toc3Page1),searchSortBy:RELEVANCE,tab:)) |access-date=May 6, 2022 |website=Canlii.org}}</ref>
 Ontario Environmental Protection Act Annotated'' (1990), Canada Law Book.

References

External links 
 SaxeFacts

Year of birth missing (living people)
Living people
Canadian environmental lawyers
Canadian women lawyers
Osgoode Hall Law School alumni
Lawyers in Ontario
21st-century Canadian lawyers
21st-century women lawyers
Women in Ontario politics
Green Party of Ontario candidates in Ontario provincial elections
Toronto city councillors
Women municipal councillors in Canada
Jewish Canadian politicians